Joseph Akinwale (born 21 May 1997), known professionally as Joeboy, is a Nigerian singer and songwriter. Mr Eazi of the record label emPawa Africa discovered him in 2017. His musical genres are Afro-pop and R&B. He was born in Lagos State, Nigeria. He's also called Young Legend.

Early life and career 
The Mr Eazi-assisted track "Fààjí" was released on 26 October 2018; he used his portion of the grant he received from emPawa100 to shoot a video for the song. Joeboy's single "Baby" was released on 1 March 2019; it garnered 20 million streams across YouTube and Spotify in 2019. The visualizer music video for "Baby" surpassed 31 million views on YouTube. Joeboy released the Killertunes-produced track "Beginning" on 15 August 2019, where its accompanying visualizer music video accumulated 23 million views on YouTube. In the video, he finds himself developing feelings for a friend whose advances he had initially dismissed. Followed by this, he released his debut extended play Love & Light in November 2019 by emPawa Africa. It was supported by the singles "Baby" and "Beginning". The EP also contains the Mayorkun-assisted track "Don't Call Me" and "All for You".

Joeboy won Best Artiste in African Pop at the 2019 All Africa Music Awards, and Best Pop at the 2020 Soundcity MVP Awards Festival. He was nominated for multiple City People Entertainment Awards and The Headies. Joeboy released the Dera-produced track "Call" on 10 April 2020. Described as a "catchy love song" by OkayAfrica , "Call" is the lead single from his upcoming debut studio album. The TG Omori-directed video for the single features dystopian sci-fi themes.

In January 2021, Joeboy announced his debut album, Somewhere Between Beauty & Magic, which was released in February 2021 to moderate commercial success.

Controversy 
Singer, Bukola Elemide, also known as Asa, issued a copyright infringement notice to Akinfenwa in October 2022, over his recently-released song, "Contour", over claims that the composition of the song was originally recorded by her and the producer of the song "Tempoe", earlier in September 2020 during a recording session. Asa, through her legal counsel made a notice to Joeboy via mail, which was shared by Joeboy on his Instagram story on 3 October 2022, revealed that she demanded the sum of N300 million and gave a 24-hour ultimatum for the song to be removed from all digital streaming platforms. Through her management, Asa also asked for a 60 percent publishing split on the song, and a written apology, as seen in the notice.

Discography

Album

EPs

Singles

As lead artist

As featured artist

Awards and nominations

Notes

References 

1997 births
Living people
21st-century Nigerian male singers
University of Lagos alumni